Szczawnik  (Shchavnyk) is a village in the administrative district of Gmina Muszyna, within Nowy Sącz County, Lesser Poland Voivodeship, in southern Poland, close to the border with Slovakia.

The village has a population of 760.

References

Villages in Nowy Sącz County